Maccabi Ironi Kfar Yona is an Israeli football club based in Kfar Yona. The club is currently in Liga Bet South A division.

History
The club was founded in 1964 as Maccabi Kfar Yona and played mostly in the lower divisions of Israeli football. In the 2006–07 season the club won Liga Bet South A division and were promoted to Liga Alef. Maccabi Ironi Kfar Yona played six seasons in Liga Alef South division, until they were relegated back to Liga Bet after the last match of the 2012–13 season, following a defeat of 2–3 to Maccabi Kabilio Jaffa.

The club had attempted to return to Liga Alef in the following season and after third-place finish in Liga Bet South A division, they qualified for the Promotion play-offs, where they beat Hapoel Kiryat Ono by a result of 4–2 in the first round; However, in the second round, they lost 0–3 after extra time to Hapoel Hod HaSharon, and remained in Liga Bet.

Honours
Liga Bet South A
Champions 2006–07

External links
Maccabi Ironi Kfar Yona Israel Football Association

References

Ironi Kfar Yona
Ironi Kfar Yona
Association football clubs established in 1964
1964 establishments in Israel